Pinjaram, also known as penyaram, kuih UFO  or kuih telinga tikus is a traditional kuih for the Bajau as well for the Bruneian Malay people in Brunei and in the state of Sabah in Malaysia.

Etymology 
The pinjaram name comes from the name of the special snacks made from rice flour from South India, kuzhi paniyaram (குழி பணியாரம்).

References 

Bruneian cuisine
Malaysian snack foods